Canada competed at the 1984 Summer Olympics in Los Angeles, United States, held from 28 July to 12 August 1984.  Canada returned to the Summer Games after having participated in the American-led boycott of the 1980 Summer Olympics. 408 competitors, 257 men and 151 women, took part in 193 events in 23 sports.

Partly due to the Soviet Union-led boycott of these Games, Canada enjoyed its best-ever results at the Summer Games, coming in sixth place in the number of Gold medals won, and fourth place in the total medals won - double their second best total in 1996 and 2016.

Medalists

Archery

Women's individual competition:
Linda Kazienko – 2421 points (→ 25th place)
Lucile Lemay – 2379 points (→ 33rd place)
Wanda Sadegur – 2349 points (→ 36th place)

Athletics

Men's Competition
Men's 100 metres
 Ben Johnson
 Tony Sharpe
 Desai Williams

Men's 200 metres
 Atlee Mahorn
 Tony Sharpe
 Desai Williams

Men's 400 metres
Doug Hinds
 Heat – 46.42
 Quarterfinals – 46.19 (→ did not advance)
 Tim Bethune
 Heat – 46.98 (→ did not advance)
Brian Saunders
 Heat – 47.40 (→ did not advance)

Men's 800 metres
 Bruce Roberts
 Simon Hoogewerf

Men's 5,000 metres
 Paul Williams
 Heat – 13:47.56
 Semifinals – 13:46.34 (→ did not advance)

Men's 10,000 metres
 Paul Williams
 Qualifying Heat – 28:36.15 (→ did not advance)

Men's marathon
 Art Boileau – 2:22:43 (→ 44th place)
 Alain Bordeleau – 2:34:27 (→ 65th place)
 Dave Edge – did not finish (→ no ranking)

Men's 110 metres Hurdles
 Mark McKoy
 Jeff Glass
 Eric Spence

Men's 400 metres Hurdles
 Lloyd Guss
 Ian Newhouse
 Pierre Léveillé

Men's 3,000 metres Steeplechase
 Greg Duhaime

Men's 4×100 metres relay
 Ben Johnson, Tony Sharpe, Desai Williams and Sterling Hinds

Men's 4×400 metres relay
 Mike Sokolowski, Douglas Hinds, Brian Saunders and Tim Bethune

Men's high jump
 Milton Ottey
 Qualification – 2.24m
 Final – 2.29m (→ 6th place)
 Alain Metellus
 Qualification – 2.18m (→ did not advance)

Men's shot put
 Bishop Dolegiewicz
 Qualifying Round – 19.00 m
 Final – 18.39 m (→ 11th place)
 Martino Catalano
 Qualifying Round – 17.24 m (→ did not advance)

Men's discus throw
 Robert Gray

Men's javelin throw
 Laslo Babits
 Qualification – 82.18m
 Final – 80.68m (→ 8th place)

Men's Decathlon
 Dave Steen
 Final Result – 8047 points (→ 6th place)

Men's 20 km walk
 Guillaume LeBlanc
 Final – 1:24:29 (→ 4th place)
 François Lapointe
 Final – 1:27:06 (→ 11th place)
 Marcel Jobin
 Final – 1:29:49 (→ 21st place)

Men's 50 km walk
 Guillaume LeBlanc
 Final – DNF (→ no ranking)
 Marcel Jobin
 Final – DNF (→ no ranking)
 François Lapointe
 Final – DSQ (→ no ranking)

Women's Competition
Women's 100 metres
 Angela Bailey
 Angella Taylor-Issajenko
 France Gareau

Women's 200 metres
 Angela Bailey

Women's 400 metres
 Marita Wiggins
 Charmaine Crooks
 Molly Killingbeck

Women's 800 metres
 Christine Slythe
 Grace Verbeek
 Ranza Clark

Women's 1,500 metres
 Brit McRoberts
 Heat – 4:10.64
 Final – 4:05.98 (→ 7th place)
 Debbie Scott
 Heat – 4:09.16
 Final – 4:10.41 (→ 10th place)

Women's 3,000 metres
 Lynn Williams
 Heat – 8.45.77
 Final – 8:42.14 (→  Bronze medal)
 Sue French
 Heat – 9.24.66 (→ did not advance)
 Geri Fitch
 Heat – 9.07.18 (→ did not advance)

Women's marathon
 Silvia Ruegger
 Final – 2:29:09 (→ 8th place)
 Anna Marie Malone
 Final – 2:36:33 (→ 17th place)
 Jacqueline Gareau
 Final – did not finish (→ no ranking)

Women's 100m hurdles
 Sylvia Forgrave
 Sue Kameli
 Karen Nelson

Women's 400m hurdles
 Andrea Page
 Heat – 59.09
 Semifinal – 57.89 (→ did not advance)
 Dana Wright
 Heat – 58.17 (→ did not advance)

Women's 4×100 metres relay
 Angela Bailey, Angella Taylor-Issajenko, France Gareau and Marita Wiggins

Women's 4×400 metres relay
 Charmaine Crooks, Jillian Briscoe, Molly Killingbeck, Marita Wiggins, and Dana Wright

Women's high jump
 Debbie Brill
 Qualification – 1.90m
 Final – 1.94m (→ 5th place)
 Brigitte Reid
 Qualification – 1.70m (→ did not advance, 27th place)

Women's shot put
Carmen Ionesco
 Final – 15.25 m (→ 12th place)

Women's discus throw
 Carmen Ionesco
 Qualification – 52.28m (→ did not advance)

Women's Heptathlon
 Jill Ross
 Final Result – 5904 points (→ 15th place)
 Connie Polman-Tuin
 Final Result – 5648 points (→ 16th place)
 Donna Smellie
 Final Result – 5638 points (→ 17th place)

Baseball

Canada competed in the Baseball tournament that was held as a demonstration sport. They finished 3rd in their pool, equivalent to 5th overall (tie).

Basketball

Men's team competition
Preliminary round (group B)
Lost to Spain (82-83)
Lost to United States (68-89)
Defeated PR China (121-80)
Defeated Uruguay (95-80)
Defeated France (96-69)
Quarterfinals
Defeated Italy (78-72)
Semifinals
Lost to United States (59-78)
Bronze Medal Game
Lost to Yugoslavia (82-88) → Fourth place
Team roster
Howard Kelsey
Tony Simms
Eli Pasquale
Karl Tilleman
Gerald Kazanowski
Jay Triano
John Hatch
Gord Herbert
Bill Wennington
Romel Raffin
Greg Wiltjer
Dan Meagher

Women's team competition
Preliminary round
Lost to South Korea (62-67)
Defeated PR China (66-61)
Defeated Australia (56-45)
Lost to Yugoslavia (68-69)
Lost to United States (61-92)
Bronze Medal Match
Lost to PR China (57-62) → Fourth place
Team roster
Lynn Polson
Tracie McAra
Anna Pendergast
Debbie Huband
Carol Jane Sealey
Alison Lang
Bev Smith
Sylvia Sweeney
Candi Clarkson-Lohr
Toni Kordic
Andrea Blackwell
Misty Thomas

Boxing

Men's flyweight (– 51 kg)
 Bill Dunlop
 First round – lost to Eyüp Can (Turkey), 0:5

Men's bantamweight (– 54 kg)
 Dale Walters →  Bronze medal
 First round – bye
 Second round – defeated Mustapha Kouchene (Algeria), 5:0
 Third round – defeated Hiroaki Takami (Japan), 5:0
 Quarterfinals – defeated Pedro Decima (Argentina), 5:0
 Semifinals – lost to Héctor López (Mexico), 0:5

Men's featherweight (– 57 kg)
 Steve Pagendam
 First round – defeated Boubacar Soumana (Nigeria), RSC-3
 Second round – lost to Paul Fitzgerald (Ireland), 2:3

Men's lightweight (– 60 kg)
John Kalbhenn
 First round – bye
 Second round – defeated Wilson Randrinasolo (MDG), RSC-1
 Third Round – lost to Reiner Gies (West Germany), 0:5

Men's Light Welterweight (– 63.5 kg)
Denis Lambert
 First round – bye
 Second round – lost to Mirko Puzović (YUG), 0:5

Men's welterweight (– 67 kg)
Wayne Gordon
 First round – lost to Mark Breland (USA), 0:5

Men's Light Middleweight (– 71 kg)
 Shawn O'Sullivan →  Silver medal
 First round – bye
 Second round – defeated Mohamed Halibi (Libya), RSC-2
 Third round – defeated Ahn Dal-Ho (South Korea), RSC-1
 Quarterfinals – defeated Rod Douglas (Great Britain), 5:0
 Semifinals – defeated Christophe Tiozzo (France), 5:0
 Final – lost to Frank Tate (USA), 0:5

Men's middleweight (– 75 kg)
Rick Duff
 First round – defeated Brendon Cannon (Australia), 5:0
 Second round – lost to Shin Joon-Sup (South Korea), 1:4

Men's Heavyweight (– 91 kg)
 Willie DeWit →  Silver medal
 First round – bye
 Second round – defeated Mohamed Bouchiche (Algeria), 5:0
 Quarterfinals – defeated Dodovic Owiny (Kenya), KO-1
 Semifinals – defeated Arnold Vanderlyde (Netherlands), 3:2
 Final – lost to Henry Tillman (USA), 0:5

Men's Super Heavyweight (+ 91 kg)
 Lennox Lewis
 First round – defeated Mohammad Yousuf (Pakistan), RSC-3
 Quarterfinals – lost to Tyrell Biggs (USA), 0:5

Canoeing

Cycling

Thirteen cyclists, ten men and three women, represented Canada in 1984.

Men's individual road race
 Steve Bauer – 4:59:57 (→  Silver medal)
 Louis Garneau – +15:30 (→ 33rd place)
 Pierre Harvey – did not finish (→ no ranking)
 Alain Masson – did not finish (→ no ranking)

Team time trial
 Pierre Harvey
 Alain Masson
 Robert Pulfer
 Martin Willock

Sprint
 Alex Ongaro

1000m time trial
 Curt Harnett

Individual pursuit
 Alex Stieda
 Gary Trevisiol

Points race
 Alex Stieda
 Gary Trevisiol

Women's individual road race
 Geneviève Robic-Brunet → 22nd place
 Marie-Claude Audet → 24th place
 Karen Strong-Hearth → 27th place

Diving

Men's 3m springboard
Randy Sageman
 Preliminary round – 527.97 (→ did not advance, 14th place)
Mike Mourant
 Preliminary round – 476.19 (→ did not advance, 23rd place)

Equestrian

Fencing

15 fencers, 10 men and 5 women, represented Canada in 1984.

Men's épée
 Michel Dessureault
 Daniel Perreault
 Jean-Marc Chouinard

Men's team épée
 Jacques Cardyn, Jean-Marc Chouinard, Alain Côté, Michel Dessureault, Daniel Perreault

Men's sabre
 Jean-Paul Banos
 Jean-Marie Banos
 Claude Marcil

Men's team sabre
 Jean-Marie Banos, Jean-Paul Banos, Marc Lavoie, Claude Marcil, Eli Sukunda

Women's foil
 Madeleine Philion
 Jacynthe Poirier
 Caroline Mitchell

Women's team foil
 Caroline Mitchell, Shelley Steiner, Madeleine Philion, Jacynthe Poirier, Marie-Huguette Cormier

Football

Men's team competition
 Preliminary round (group B)
 Canada – Iraq 1 – 1
 Canada – Yugoslavia 0 – 1
 Canada – Cameroon 3 – 1
 Quarter Finals
 Canada – Brazil 1 – 1 (→ Brazil wins 4-2 on penalties)
Team Roster:
 ( 1.) Tino Lettieri
 ( 2.) Bob Lenarduzzi
 ( 3.) Bruce Wilson
 ( 4.) Terry Moore
 ( 5.) Ian Bridge
 ( 6.) Randy Ragan
 ( 7.) David Norman
 ( 8.) Gerry Gray
 ( 9.) Ken Garraway
 (10.) Dale Mitchell
 (11.) Mike Sweeney
 (12.) Igor Vrablic
 (13.) Craig Martin
 (14.) Pasquale De Luca
 (15.) Paul James
 (16.) John Catliff
 (22.) Sven Habermann

Gymnastics

Hockey

Men's team competition
Preliminary round (group B)
 Canada – Netherlands 1-4
 Canada – Great Britain 1-3
 Canada – Kenya 2-3
 Canada – Pakistan 1-7
 Canada – New Zealand 2-2
Classification matches
 9th/12th place: Canada – Malaysia 1-0
 9th/10th place: Canada – Kenya 0-1 (after extra time) → 10th place
Team roster
 Julian Austin
 David Bissett
 Patrick Burrows
 Pat Caruso
 Paul "Bubli" Chohan
 Ernie Cholakis
 Aaron Fernandes
 Ken Goodwin (gk)
 Kip Hladky
 Bruce MacPherson
 Reg Plummer
 Trevor Porritt
 Harbhajan Rai
 Ross Rutledge
 Nick Sandhu
 Rob Smith
Head coach: Shiv Jagday

Women's team competition
Round robin
 Canada – United States 1-4
 Canada – West Germany 0-3
 Canada – Australia 2-1
 Canada – Netherlands 2-2
 Canada – New Zealand 4-1 → 5th place
Team roster
 Shelley Andrews
 Lisa Bauer
 Sharon Bayes (gk)
 Lynne Beecroft
 Laura Branchaud
 Nancy Charlton
 Sharon Creelman
 Phyllis Ellis
 Sheila Forshaw
 Karen Hewlett
 Laurie Lambert
 Zoe MacKinnon (gk)
 Jean Major
 Darlene Stoyka
 Diane Virjee
 Terry Wheatley
Head coach: Marina van der Merwe

Judo

Men's Extra-Lightweight (– 60 kg)
 Phil Takahashi

Men's Half-Lightweight (– 66 kg)
 Brad Farrow

Men's lightweight (– 73 kg)
 Glenn Beauchamp

Men's Half-Middleweight (– 81 kg)
 Kevin Doherty

Men's middleweight (– 90 kg)
 Louis Jani

Men's half-heavyweight (– 100 kg)
 Joseph Meli

Men's Heavyweight (+ 100 kg)
 Mark Berger

Men's Open Class
 Fred Blaney

Rhythmic gymnastics

Rowing

Sailing

Shooting

Swimming

Men's Competition
Men's 100m freestyle
David Churchill
 Heat – 51.85 (→ did not advance, 22nd place)
Blair Hicken
 Heat – 52.74 (→ did not advance, 29th place)

Men's 200m freestyle
Peter Szmidt
 Heat – 1:52.48
 B-Final – 1:52.56 (→ 14th place)
Alex Baumann
 Heat – 1:51.76
 B-Final – scratched (→ 17th place)

Men's 400m freestyle
Peter Szmidt
 Heat – 3:55.65
 B-Final – 3:56.99 (→ 11th place)
David Shemilt
 Heat – 3:58.43 (→ did not advance, 19th place)

Men's 1500m freestyle
David Shemilt
 Heat – 15:24.78
 Final – 15:31.28 (→ 7th place)
Bernard Volz
 Heat – 15:31.38 (→ did not advance, 13th place)

Men's 100m Backstroke
Mike West
 Heat – 57.76
 Final – 56.49 (→  Bronze medal)
Sandy Goss
 Heat – 57.60
 Final – 57.46 (→ 7th place)

Men's 200m Backstroke
Cameron Henning
 Heat – 2:03.36
 Final – 2:02.37 (→  Bronze medal)
Mike West
 Heat – 2:04.93
 B-Final – 2:04.73 (→ 10th place)

Men's 100m Breaststroke
Victor Davis
 Heat – 1:03.63
 Final – 1:01.99 (→  Silver medal)
Marco Veilleux
 Heat – 1:05.34 (→ did not advance, 19th place)

Men's 200m Breaststroke
Victor Davis
 Heat – 2:18.20
 Final – 2:13.34 (→  Gold medal)
Ken Fitzpatrick
 Heat – 2:19.74
 Final – 2:18.86 (→ 5th place)

Men's 100m Butterfly
Tom Ponting
 Heat – 55.23
 B-Final – 55.31 (→ 9th place)
Dave Churchill
 Heat – 55.84 (→ did not advance, 18th place)

Men's 200m Butterfly
Tom Ponting
 Heat – 1:59.78
 Final – 1:59.37 (→ 6th place)
Peter Ward
 Heat – 1:59.99
 Final – 2:00.39 (→ 7th place)

Men's 200m Individual Medley
Alex Baumann
 Heat – 2:03.60
 Final – 2:01.42 (→  Gold medal)
Rob Chernoff
 Heat – 2:08.47 (→ did not advance, 21st place)

Men's 400m Individual Medley
Alex Baumann
 Heat – 4:22.46
 Final – 4:17.41 (→  Gold medal)
Peter Dobson
 Heat – 4:29.61
 B-Final – 4:30.09 (→ 14th place)

Men's 4 × 100 m freestyle Relay
Sandy Goss, Alex Baumann, Blair Hicken, and Levente Mady
 Heat – 3:25.94
David Churchill, Blair Hicken, Alex Baumann, and Sandy Goss
 Final – 3:24.70 (→ 7th place)

Men's 4 × 200 m freestyle Relay
Sandy Goss, Benoit Clement, Wayne Kelly, and Peter Szmidt
 Heat – 7:28.31
Sandy Goss, Wayne Kelly, Peter Szmidt, and Alex Baumann
 Final – 7:26.51 (→ 5th place)

Men's 4 × 100 m Medley Relay
Mike West, Victor Davis, Tom Ponting, and Sandy Goss
 Heat – 3:46.12
 Final – 3:43.23 (→  Silver medal)

Women's Competition
Women's 100m freestyle
Pamela Rai
 Heat – 57.41
 B-Final – 57.56 (→ 12th place)
Jane Kerr
 Heat – 58.46
 B-Final – 57.85 (→ 14th place)

Women's 200m freestyle
Julie Daigneault
 Heat – 2:03.40
 B-Final – 2:03.67 (→ 11th place)
Jane Kerr
 Heat – 2:04.02
 B-Final – 2:04.19 (→ 14th place)

Women's 400m freestyle
Julie Daigneault
 Heat – 4:16.60
 Final – 4:16.41 (→ 8th place)
Donna McGinnis
 Heat – 4:19.48
 B-Final – 4:15.59 (→ 10th place)

Women's 800m freestyle
Karen Ward
 Heat – 8:45.37
 Final – 8:48.12 (→ 8th place)
Donna McGinnis
 Heat – 8:51.71 (→ did not advance, 10th place)

Women's 4 × 100 m freestyle Relay
Jane Kerr, Maureen New, Cheryl McArton, and Carol Klimpel
 Heat – 3:50.40
Pamela Rai, Carol Klimpel, Cheryl McArton, and Jane Kerr
 Final – 3:49.50 (→ 5th place)

Women's 4 × 100 m Medley Relay
Reema Abdo, Anne Ottenbrite, Michelle MacPherson, and Pamela Rai
 Heat – 4:15.70
 Final – 4:12.98 (→  Bronze medal)

Women's 100m Backstroke
Reema Abdo
 Heat – 1:04.92
 B-Final – 1:05.13 (→ 14th place)
Michelle MacPherson
 Heat – 1:06.04 (→ did not advance, 19th place)

Women's 200m Backstroke
Reema Abdo
 Heat – 2:19.05
 B-Final – 2:18.50 (→ 12th place)
Melinda Copp
 Heat – 2:21.39 (→ did not advance, 19th place)

Women's 200m Butterfly
Jill Horstead
 Heat – 2:14.88
 B-Final – 2:13.49 (→ 9th place)
Marie Moore
 Heat – 2:14.95
 B-Final – 2:14.96 (→ 11th place)

Women's 200m Individual Medley
Michelle MacPherson
 Heat – 2:20.68
 B-Final – 2:19.34 (→ 10th place)
Alison Dozzo
 Heat – 2:20.85
 B-Final – 2:19.70 (→ 11th place)

Women's 400m Individual Medley
Nathalie Gingras
 Heat – 4:51.77
 Final – 4:50.55 (→ 5th place)
Donna McGinnis
 Heat – 4:53.30
 Final – 4:50.65 (→ 6th place)

Synchronized swimming

Volleyball

Men's team competition
Preliminary round (group B)
 Lost to Italy (1-3)
 Defeated Egypt (3-0)
 Defeated China (3-0)
 Defeated Japan (3-0)
Semi-finals
 Lost to United States (0-3)
Bronze Medal Match
 Lost to Italy (0-3) → 4th place
Team roster
 Rick Bacon
 John Barrett
 Allan Coulter
 Terry Danyluk
 Paul Gratton
 Glenn Hoag
 Tom Jones
 Dave Jones
 Alex Ketrzynski
 Garth Pischke
 Don Saxton
 Randy Wagner

Women's team competition
Preliminary round (group A)
 Lost to Peru (0-3)
 Lost to South Korea (0-3)
 Lost to Japan (0-3)
Classification matches
 5th/8th place: lost to West Germany (0-3)
 7th/8th place: lost to Brazil (0-3) → 8th place
Team roster
 Diane Ratnik
 Suzi Smith
 Tracey Mills
 Joyce Gamborg
 Audrey Vandervelden
 Monica Hitchcock
 Karen Fraser
 Rachel Beliveau
 Lise Martin
 Caroline Cote
 Barbara Broen
 Josee Lebel

Water polo

Men's team competition
Preliminary round (group A)
 Lost to Yugoslavia (4-13)
 Lost to Netherlands (9-10)
 Lost to China (5-6)
Final Round (Group E)
 Lost to Greece (8-11)
 Drew with Brazil (10-10)
 Defeated Japan (8-5)
 Lost to Italy (9-16) → 10th place
Team roster
 Rick Zayonc
 Alexander Juhasz
 George Gross
 Sylvain Huet
 John Anderson
 Paul Pottier
 Simon De-Schamps
 Brian Collyer
 Bill Meyer
 Rene Bol
 Gordon Vantol
 Geoff Brown
 Dominique Dion

Weightlifting

Wrestling

References

Nations at the 1984 Summer Olympics
1984
Summer Olympics